Hyloxalus elachyhistus is a species of frog in the family Dendrobatidae. It is found in southern Ecuador (both versants of the Andes) and northern Peru, in the Huancabamba Depression and south to Cajabamba Province.

Description
Hyloxalus elachyhistus shows considerable intraspecies variability, and it might represent more than one species. Ecuadorian males measure  and females  in snout–vent length. Peruvian specimens are smaller: males measure  and females  SVL. Dorsum varies in colour between populations, from pale olive to brown. There is a pale yellow to tan oblique lateral stripe, usually narrowly bordered by dark brown or black.

Males may protect the egg clutch. Both males and females may transport the tadpoles.

Habitat and conservation
Its natural habitats are dry and humid lowland and premontane forests. It occurs near streams, especially in dry forests. It is threatened by habitat loss. Declines at high elevations have taken place even in suitable habitat and could be due to chytridiomycosis.

References

elachyhistus
Amphibians of the Andes
Amphibians of Ecuador
Amphibians of Peru
Amphibians described in 1971
Taxonomy articles created by Polbot